Pedro Depablos (born 2 January 1977) is a Venezuelan former footballer. He played in one match for the Venezuela national football team in 2004. He was also part of Venezuela's squad for the 2004 Copa América tournament.

References

External links
 

1977 births
Living people
Venezuelan footballers
Venezuela international footballers
Place of birth missing (living people)
Association football forwards
UA Maracaibo players
Deportivo Táchira F.C. players
Caracas FC players
Aragua FC players
Estudiantes de Mérida players
Guaros F.C. players
Asociación Civil Deportivo Lara players
Atlético El Vigía players
Venezuelan football managers
Deportivo La Guaira managers
Academia Puerto Cabello managers